Martín Pucheta (born February 10, 1988 in Córdoba, Argentina) is an Argentine footballer who plays for Douglas Haig in the Torneo Federal A.

External links
 Profile at BDFA.com.ar

References

1988 births
Living people
Argentine footballers
Argentine expatriate footballers
Racing Club de Avellaneda footballers
Club Atlético Los Andes footballers
Club Atlético Acassuso footballers
Independiente Rivadavia footballers
F.C. Motagua players
Andes Talleres Sport Club players
Deportivo Maipú players
Club Atlético Douglas Haig players
Torneo Federal A players
Primera Nacional players
Liga Nacional de Fútbol Profesional de Honduras players
Footballers from Córdoba, Argentina
Expatriate footballers in Honduras
Argentine expatriate sportspeople in Honduras
Association football defenders